Various governmental agencies involved with environmental protection and with occupational safety and health have promulgated regulations limiting the allowable concentrations of gaseous pollutants in the ambient air or in emissions to the ambient air. Such regulations involve a number of different expressions of concentration.  Some express the concentrations as ppmv and some express the concentrations as mg/m3, while others require adjusting or correcting the concentrations to reference conditions of moisture content, oxygen content or carbon dioxide content. This article presents a set of useful conversions and formulas for air dispersion modeling of atmospheric pollutants and for complying with the various regulations as to how to express the concentrations obtained by such modeling.

Converting air pollutant concentrations

The conversion equations depend on the temperature at which the conversion is wanted (usually about 20 to 25 degrees Celsius).  At an ambient air pressure of 1 atmosphere (101.325 kPa), the general equation is:

and for the reverse conversion:

Notes:
 Pollution regulations in the United States typically reference their pollutant limits to an ambient temperature of 20 to 25 °C as noted above. In most other nations, the reference ambient temperature for pollutant limits may be 0 °C or other values.
 1 percent by volume = 10,000 ppmv (i.e., parts per million by volume).
 atm = absolute atmospheric pressure in atmospheres
 mol = gram mole

Correcting concentrations for altitude

Atmospheric pollutant concentrations expressed as mass per unit volume of atmospheric air (e.g., mg/m3, µg/m3, etc.) at sea level will decrease with increasing altitude because the atmospheric pressure decreases with increasing altitude.

The change of atmospheric pressure with altitude can be obtained from this equation:

Given an atmospheric pollutant concentration at an atmospheric pressure of 1 atmosphere (i.e., at sea level altitude), the concentration at other altitudes can be obtained from this equation:

As an example, given a concentration of 260 mg/m3 at sea level, calculate the equivalent concentration at an altitude of 1,800 meters:

Ca = 260 × 0.9877 18 = 208 mg/m3 at 1,800 meters altitude

Standard conditions for gas volumes

A normal cubic meter (Nm3 ) is the metric expression of gas volume at standard conditions and it is usually (but not always) defined as being measured at 0 °C and 1 atmosphere of pressure.

A standard cubic foot (scf) is the USA expression of gas volume at standard conditions and it is often (but not always) defined as being measured at 60 °F and 1 atmosphere of pressure. There are other definitions of standard gas conditions used in the USA besides 60 °F and 1 atmosphere.

That being understood:

1 Nm3 of any gas (measured at 0 °C and 1 atmosphere of absolute pressure) equals 37.326 scf of that gas (measured at 60 °F and 1 atmosphere of absolute pressure).

1 kmol of any ideal gas equals 22.414 Nm3 of that gas at 0 °C and 1 atmosphere of absolute pressure ... and 1 lbmol of any ideal gas equals 379.482 scf of that gas at 60 °F and 1 atmosphere of absolute pressure.

Notes:
 kmol = kilomole or kilogram mole
 lbmol = pound mole

Windspeed conversion factors

Meteorological data includes windspeeds which may be expressed as statute miles per hour, knots, or meters per second. Here are the conversion factors for those various expressions of windspeed:

1 m/s = 2.237 statute mile/h = 1.944 knots
1 knot = 1.151 statute mile/h = 0.514 m/s
1 statute mile/h = 0.869 knots = 0.447 m/s

Note:
 1 statute mile = 5,280 feet = 1,609 meters

Correcting for reference conditions

Many environmental protection agencies have issued regulations that limit the concentration of pollutants in gaseous emissions and define the reference conditions applicable to those concentration limits.  For example, such a regulation might limit the concentration of NOx to 55 ppmv in a dry combustion exhaust gas corrected to 3 volume percent O2.  As another example, a regulation might limit the concentration of particulate matter to 0.1 grain per standard cubic foot (i.e., scf) of dry exhaust gas corrected to 12 volume percent CO2.

Environmental agencies in the USA often denote a standard cubic foot of dry gas as "dscf" or as "scfd".  Likewise, a standard cubic meter of dry gas is often denoted as "dscm" or "scmd" (again, by environmental agencies in the USA).

Correcting to a dry basis

If a gaseous emission sample is analyzed and found to contain water vapor and a pollutant concentration of say 40 ppmv, then 40 ppmv should be designated as the "wet basis" pollutant concentration.  The following equation can be used to correct the measured "wet basis" concentration to a "dry basis" concentration:

Thus, a wet basis concentration of 40 ppmv in a gas having 10 volume percent water vapor would have a dry basis concentration = 40 ÷ ( 1 - 0.10 ) = 44.44 ppmv.

Correcting to a reference oxygen content

The following equation can be used to correct a measured pollutant concentration in an emitted gas (containing a measured O2 content) to an equivalent pollutant concentration in an emitted gas containing a specified reference amount of O2:

Thus, a measured  concentration of 45 ppmv (dry basis) in a gas having 5 volume % O2 is
45 × ( 20.9 - 3 ) ÷ ( 20.9 - 5 ) = 50.7 ppmv (dry basis) of  when corrected to a gas having a specified reference O2 content of 3 volume %.

Correcting to a reference carbon dioxide content

The following equation can be used to correct a measured pollutant concentration in an emitted gas (containing a measured CO2 content) to an equivalent pollutant concentration in an emitted gas containing a specified reference amount of CO2:

 
Thus, a measured particulates concentration of 0.1 grain per dscf in a gas that has 8 volume % CO2 is
0.1 × ( 12 ÷ 8 ) = 0.15 grain per dscf when corrected to a gas having a specified reference CO2 content of 12 volume %.

Notes:
 Although ppmv and grains per dscf have been used in the above examples, concentrations such as ppbv (i.e., parts per billion by volume), volume percent, grams per dscm and many others may also be used.
 1 percent by volume = 10,000 ppmv (i.e., parts per million by volume).
 Care must be taken with the concentrations expressed as ppbv to differentiate between the British billion which is 1012 and the USA billion which is 109.

See also

 Standard conditions of temperature and pressure
 Units conversion by factor-label
 Atmospheric dispersion modeling
 Roadway air dispersion modeling
 Bibliography of atmospheric dispersion modeling
 Accidental release source terms
 Choked flow

References

External links
 More conversions and formulas useful in air dispersion modeling are available in the feature articles at www.air-dispersion.com.
 U.S. EPA tutorial course has very useful information.

Atmospheric dispersion modeling
Air pollution
Environmental engineering